Baek Jeong-gi (백정기, 19 January 1896 – 5 June 1934) was a Korean anarchist independence fighter during the Japanese occupation.

Early life 
He was born in Buan, North Jeolla.

After death 

In 1946, Pak Yol recovered the remains of Lee Bong-chang, Yun Bong-gil and Baek Jeong-gi from Japan and conducted the national funeral on July 6. Baek is buried in the tomb of Hyochang Park.

References 

1896 births
1934 deaths
Korean independence activists
Korean anarchists